The 2016–17 European Rugby Champions Cup pool stage was the first stage of the 22nd season of European club rugby union, and the third under the European Rugby Champions Cup format.

It involved 20 teams competing, across 5 pools of 4 teams, for 8 quarter-final places – awarded to the 5 pool winners and the 3 top-ranked pool runners-up.

The pool stage began on the weekend of 14–16 October 2016, and ended following Round 6, on the weekend of 23–25 January 2017.

Seeding
The 20 competing teams are seeded and split into four tiers, each containing 5 teams.

For the purpose of creating the tiers, clubs are ranked based on their domestic league performances and on their qualification for the knockout phases of their championships, so a losing quarter-finalist in the Top 14 would be seeded below a losing semi-finalist, even if they finished above them in the regular season.

Based on these seedings, teams are placed into one of the four tiers, with the top seed clubs being put in Tier 1. The nature of the tier system means that a draw is needed to allocate two of the three second seed clubs to Tier 1. Exeter Chiefs and Leinster were drawn into Tier 1, meaning the remaining side - Toulon went into Tier 2. As a result of this draw, Montpellier also entered Tier 2, as the fourth seed from the league of the second seed placed in Tier 2. The other two fourth rankes sides fell into Tier 3.

The tiers are shown below. Brackets show each team's seeding and their league (for example, 1 Top 14 indicates the team was seeded 1st from the Top 14).

Pool stage
The draw took place on 29 June 2016 in Neuchâtel, Switzerland.

During the pool stage, the teams played the 3 other teams in their pool twice, both at home and away, Based on the result of the match, teams receive competition points as follows:
 4 points for a win,
 2 points for a draw,
 1 attacking bonus point for scoring four or more tries in a match,
 1 defensive bonus point for losing a match by seven points or less.

Following the pool stage, the five winners from each group progressed to the quarter-finals, along with the three best pool runners-up from the competition (the three of the five runners-up with the highest number of competition points). To seed the quarter-finals, the five pool winners will be ranked 1st to 5th and the three best-placed runners-up ranked 6th to 8th, based on who got the most competition points. In the event of a tie between two or more teams from the same pool, the following criteria would be used as tie-breakers:
 The club with the greater number of competition points from only matches involving tied teams.
 If equal, the club with the best aggregate points difference from those matches.
 If equal, the club that scored the most tries in those matches.

If this did not separate teams, and/or the tie related to teams that did not play each other (i.e., in different pools), the following tie breakers would be used:
 If equal, the club with the best aggregate points difference from the pool stage.
 The club that scored the most tries in the pool stage.
 If equal, the club with the fewest players suspended in the pool stage.
 If equal, the drawing of lots will determine a club's ranking.

Pool 1

Pool 2

Assistant referee Mathieu Raynal replaced the original referee Jérôme Garcès on the 73rd minute of the game after pulling a hamstring.

Pool 3

Pool 4

Pool 5

Notes

References

2016–17 European Rugby Champions Cup
2016-17